Walter Joyce (10 September 1937 – 29 September 1999) was an English professional footballer and manager who played as a wing half, born in Oldham, Lancashire. His son, Warren Joyce, also played for Burnley.

External links
 
 

1937 births
1999 deaths
People from Oldham
English footballers
English football managers
Footballers from Oldham
Association football defenders
Burnley F.C. players
Blackburn Rovers F.C. players
Huddersfield Town A.F.C. non-playing staff
Oldham Athletic A.F.C. players
Rochdale A.F.C. managers
Bolton Wanderers F.C. non-playing staff
Preston North End F.C. non-playing staff
Bury F.C. non-playing staff
English Football League players
English Football League managers